The National Andorran Coalition (CNA) was a political party in Andorra.

History
The party was established in 1993 after political parties were legalised. In the elections that year it received 17.2% of the vote and won two seats in the General Council. However, the party did not contest any further elections.

References

Political parties established in 1993
Defunct political parties in Andorra
1993 establishments in Andorra
Political parties with year of disestablishment missing